Sibady (Sibäźe) is a rural locality (a selo) in Asavdybashsky Selsoviet, Yanaulsky District, Bashkortostan, Russia. The population was 146 as of 2010. There are 2 streets.

Geography 
Sibady is located 33 km southeast of Yanaul (the district's administrative centre) by road. Asavdyash is the nearest rural locality.

References 

Rural localities in Yanaulsky District